The Stanford arm is an industrial robot with six degrees of freedom, designed at Stanford University by Victor Scheinman in 1969. 
The Stanford arm is a serial manipulator whose kinematic chain consists of two revolute joints at the base, a prismatic joint, and a spherical joint. Because it includes several kinematic pairs, it is often used as an educational example in robot kinematics.

References

-
Robotic manipulators